Pleasant Retreat Academy, also known as The Confederate Memorial Hall, is a historic building located at 129 East Pine Street, Lincolnton, North Carolina.

History
Pleasant Retreat Academy was built between 1817 and 1820, and is a two-story brick building, four bays wide and two deep, on a low fieldstone foundation in a restrained Federal-style. It has a gable roof and a partially exposed, single-shoulder chimney on each gable end. The school remained in operation until about 1878. It later housed a private residence, private school, and the Lincoln County Public Library until 1965. It was listed on the National Register of Historic Places in 1975.

Former pupils
 William Graham (1804–1875), American politician
 James Henderson (1808–1858), American politician
 Robert Hoke (1837–1912), Confederate States Army general
 Hoke Smith (1855–1931), American politician

See also

 National Register of Historic Places listings in Lincoln County, North Carolina
 United Daughters of the Confederacy

References

Further reading

External links

Historic Schools of the Charlotte Region at the University of North Carolina at Charlotte Urban Institute

Buildings and structures in Lincoln County, North Carolina
Federal architecture in North Carolina
National Register of Historic Places in Lincoln County, North Carolina
School buildings completed in 1820
School buildings on the National Register of Historic Places in North Carolina
Tourist attractions in Lincoln County, North Carolina